Hordern Gap is a gap,  wide, between Mount Coates and Mount Hordern in the David Range of the Framnes Mountains of Antarctica. It was mapped by Norwegian cartographers from aerial photographs taken by the Lars Christensen Expedition, 1936–37. This gap was used by Australian National Antarctic Research Expeditions (ANARE) parties in 1957 and 1958 as a route through the range, and was named by ANARE for its proximity to Mount Hordern.

References

Mountain passes of Antarctica
Landforms of Mac. Robertson Land